Saša Dončić (Anglicized: Sasha Doncic; born June 14, 1974) is a Slovenian professional basketball coach and former player.
He last served as head coach of Ilirija in the Slovenian League. He is the father of Luka Dončić.

As a player, Dončić played in several clubs in Slovenia, and also in Serbia and France. He mainly played at the shooting guard and small forward positions, but could also play at power forward if needed.

Professional career
During his pro club career, Dončić won 2 Slovenian Premier A League championships (2007, 2008), and 3 Slovenian Cups, (2004, 2007, 2008). He also won the Slovenian Supercup, in 2007. He played in the European-wide top-tier level league, the EuroLeague, during the 2007–08 season.

National team career
Dončić was a member of the Yugoslavia national cadet team at the 1991 FIBA Europe Under-16 Championship in Greece. Over four tournament games, he averaged 2.0 points per game.

In 2004, he played in two games for the senior Slovenian national basketball team at the FIBA EuroBasket 2005 qualification.

Coaching career
After retiring from playing professional basketball, Dončić began his career working as a basketball coach, in 2010.

Personal life
Dončić was born in Šempeter pri Gorici, Yugoslavia, now present-day Slovenia. His family is of Serbian descent. He was married to Slovenian model and beauty salon owner Mirjam Poterbin, until their divorce in 2008. His son Luka, who is also a professional basketball player, currently plays with the Dallas Mavericks in the NBA.

References

External links 
 Euroleague.net Profile 
 FIBA Profile
 FIBA Europe Profile
 Eurobasket.com Profile

1974 births
Living people
People from Šempeter pri Gorici
Slovenian people of Serbian descent
Slovenian men's basketball players
Small forwards
Power forwards (basketball)
Shooting guards
ABA League players
KD Ilirija players
KD Slovan players
KK Krka players
KK Olimpija players
KK Sloga players
Slovenian basketball coaches
Slovenian expatriate basketball people in Serbia